The Loew's Valencia Theatre is a former movie palace at 16511 Jamaica Avenue in Queens, New York City. Built in 1929 as one of the Loew's Wonder Theatres, the theater was donated to The Tabernacle of Prayer for All People in 1977. It was designated an exterior landmark on May 25, 1999 by the New York City Landmarks Preservation Commission.

Background 
In 1926–27, builder Ralph Riccardo acquired the site at Jamaica Avenue and Merrick Road, selling half of the site to the Famous Players-Lasky Corporation (Paramount) who then sold the property to Loew’s. Construction started in June 1928 by the Thompson-Starrett Company and was completed in December of that year. It was designed by John Eberson, known for his atmospheric theaters. The interior is adorned in Spanish Colonial and pre-Columbian styles. While the facade is made of brick and terra cotta in the Spanish and Mexican style of the Baroque period. The auditorium walls are adorned with statues, parapets and towers, asymmetrically arranged while the ceiling remains unadorned, like a sky above. 

The theatre seats 3,500 people and was the first of the five Loew’s Wonder Theatres, opening on January 12, 1929, with Monte Blue and Raquel Torres in “White Shadows in the South Seas” plus vaudeville on stage. Along with the other Wonder Theatres, it was equipped with a Robert Morton ‘Wonder’ organ of 4 manuals and 23 ranks. It quickly became an attraction for people in not only Jamaica, but Queens and the greater Long Island area to watch the movies. In 1977, the building was donated to the Tabernacle of Prayer who restored the theatre. The organ moved to the Balboa Theatre in San Diego, California where it was restored and debuted in 2009.

References 

1929 establishments in New York City
Cinemas and movie theaters in New York City
Commercial buildings completed in 1929
Commercial buildings in Queens, New York
Culture of New York City
Jamaica, Queens
Valencia
Movie palaces
New York City Designated Landmarks in Queens, New York